Minuscule 80 (in the Gregory-Aland numbering), ε 281 (von Soden), known as Cod. T. G. Graevii, is a Greek minuscule manuscript of the New Testament, on parchment leaves. Palaeographically it has been assigned to the 12th century. The manuscript has complex contents. It has marginalia.

Description 

The codex contains complete text of the four Gospels with a commentary on 309 parchment leaves (size ). The text is written in one column per page, 23 lines per page. The initial letters are in colour.

In the 15th century the Latin chapters were added.

Text

Text-type 

The Greek text of the codex is a representative of the Byzantine text-type. Aland placed it in Category V. 
It is close textually to the minuscule 140.

It was not examined by using the Claremont Profile Method.

Textual variants 

In Luke 3:23-38 (Genealogy of Jesus) it was rewritten from a three-column text, and columns were confused, and instead of copying them vertically in proper succession, the scribe copied the genealogy as though the two columns were one, following the lines across both columns. As a result, almost everyone is made the son of the wrong father: του Ιωραμ, του Καιναν, του Ιωδη, του Εσρωμ, του Ενος (see Minuscule 109).

In John 3:13 it has reading ανθρωπου ο ων εκ του ουρανου for ανθρωπου, the reading is supported only by Uncial 0141 and Syriac Curetonian (syrc);

History 

It once belonged to Johannes Georg Graeve (hence name of the codex) and was collated by Anthony Bynaeus in 1691 (see minuscule 579). Then it passed into the hands Johannes van der Hagen, who showed it to Wettstein in 1739.

It is currently housed in at the Bibliothèque nationale de France (Smith-Lasouëf 5), at Paris.

See also 

 List of New Testament minuscules
 Biblical manuscript
 Textual criticism

References

Further reading 

 

Greek New Testament minuscules
12th-century biblical manuscripts
Bibliothèque nationale de France collections